Simon in the Land of Chalk Drawings is a British children's animated series about the adventures of a young boy named Simon, who has a magic blackboard. Things that Simon draws on the chalkboard become real in the Land of Chalk Drawings, which Simon can enter by climbing over a fence near his home with a ladder. The stories often revolve around the unintended effects that Simon's drawings have on the Land of Chalk Drawings, such as when an upset Simon draws a picture of his angry self, which goes on a rampage.

The programme is based upon a series of four children's books by Edward McLachlan. It was produced in the mid-1970s by FilmFair Productions in London for Thames Television, and was originally a five-minute programme, broadcast around tea time in Britain. It also became familiar to American audiences in the mid-1970s when it was featured on Captain Kangaroo (where it was narrated by Bob Keeshan instead of Bernard Cribbins), later on Pinwheel, and after that, on Romper Room. In Canada, it aired on TVOntario. The writer and performer of the theme song is Mike Batt, with his first wife Wendy on vocals. Mike Batt also wrote the theme for The Wombles, also produced by FilmFair and narrated by Bernard Cribbins. 

In 2002 the series was remade in Canada, with Ernie Coombs as the narrator.

Original episodes

Series overview

Series 1

Series 2

2002 revival

A new series premiered in 2002 on Teletoon in Canada with a new theme song, an updated and more casual outfit for Simon, a different colour scheme and narrated by Ernie Coombs (in his final role; in a tragic subnote, he would suffer an ultimately-fatal stroke while recording his last sessions for the show ). It was co-produced by Cinar Animation and Shanghai Animation Film Studio and directed by Francois Perreault. Simon's friend Henry is replaced with a girl named Lily. In this new version, Simon wears a striped T-shirt, shorts, and sneakers.

Parody
The series was later parodied on NBC's Saturday Night Live by Mike Myers. The sketches open with the same musical theme and lyrics, but take place in Simon's bathtub, where he shows and discusses his "drawerings" with viewers.

See also
 The Magic Chalk (1949)
 ChalkZone (1998)
 Harold and the Purple Crayon (1955)
 Penny Crayon (1989)

References

External links
 
 
 
 
 Simon in the Land of Chalk Drawings at TheChestnut.com. Retrieved 5 January 2014.

1970s British children's television series
2000s Canadian animated television series
1974 British television series debuts
1976 British television series endings
2002 Canadian television series debuts
2002 Chinese television series debuts
British children's animated fantasy television series
Canadian children's animated fantasy television series
Chinese children's animated fantasy television series
ITV children's television shows
Teletoon original programming
Television series by Cookie Jar Entertainment
Television series by FilmFair
Television series by DHX Media
British television shows based on children's books
Canadian television shows based on children's books
English-language television shows
Chinese-language television shows
2002 Canadian television series endings
2002 Chinese television series endings
1970s British animated television series
YTV (Canadian TV channel) original programming
Animated television series about children